James Edney (1870-1951), was an English bowls player who competed in the 1930 British Empire Games.

Bowls career
At the 1930 British Empire Games he won the gold medal in the rinks (fours) event with Ernie Gudgeon, James Frith and Albert Hough.

He was the 1932 fours National Champion bowling for Atherley BC, Southampton.

Personal life
He was a wholesale grocer by trade and lived in Southampton. He married Edith Catherine Edis, who accompanied him to Hamilton in 1930.

References

English male bowls players
Bowls players at the 1930 British Empire Games
Commonwealth Games gold medallists for England
Commonwealth Games medallists in lawn bowls
1870 births
1951 deaths
Medallists at the 1930 British Empire Games